Acacia atrox, commonly known as Myall Creek wattle, is a shrub belonging to the genus Acacia and the subgenus Phyllodineae that is endemic to a small area in New South Wales.

Description
The light green sessile phyllodes have a quadrangular shape and have a yellow nerve at apex of each angle.

Taxonomy
The species was first formally described by the botanist Phillip Kodela in 2001 as part of the work Acacia atrox (Fabaceae: Mimosoideae), a new rare species from the North Western Slopes, New South Wales as published in the journal Telopea. It was reclassified as Racosperma atrox by Leslie Pedley in 2003 thentransferred back o the genus Acacia in 2011.

Distribution
It has a limited distribution around the Inverell area in the north western slopes of New South Wales where it is found on slopes and low hills growing in clay soils over basalt, on basalt in cleared areas or as part of open well grassed Eucalyptus'' woodland communities.

See also
 List of Acacia species

References

atrox
Flora of New South Wales
Plants described in 2001